Lee Ji-hoon (born November 22, 1996), better known by his stage name Woozi, is a South Korean singer, songwriter and record producer. He is a member of the boy band Seventeen. Aside from his work as a soloist and with Seventeen, Woozi has also written for other K-pop artists such as NU'EST W, Ailee, I.O.I and Chanyeol.

Early life 
From a young age, Woozi studied classical music and learned to play the clarinet and other band instruments. He successfully auditioned for Pledis Entertainment and met labelmate Bumzu, a frequent collaborator on music production. He graduated from Hanlim Multi Art School and subsequently enrolled in Hanyang University.

Career

2015–present: Debut with Seventeen and solo activities 
On May 26, 2015, Woozi debuted in the self-producing group Seventeen with the single "Adore U". He helped write and produce every track on their debut extended play (EP) 17 Carat. He has since become Seventeen's main producer, alongside singer and songwriter Bumzu, and is currently credited for writing over 80% of the group's discography.

Shortly thereafter, Woozi began writing for other artists as well. In 2016, he and Ailee wrote lyrics for her collaboration with Eric Nam, "Feelin'". In 2017, Woozi wrote the last single released by the project group I.O.I, "Downpour", whose lyrics received praise. Later that year, he gifted the song "지금까지 행복했어요" to South Korean singer Baekho of boy band NU'EST W, which was featured in the group's first EP W, Here. Woozi became a full member of the Korea Music Copyright Association in 2019. On October 15, 2019, Woozi released the song "Miracle" for the soundtrack of the drama The Tale of Nokdu. 

In 2021, he worked with fellow Seventeen member Hoshi on his new song "Spider", which debuted at number five on the Billboard World Digital Song Sales chart. That year, Woozi won Best Producer at the 6th Asia Artist Awards, becoming the youngest recipient of the accolade in the show's history. On January 3, 2022, Woozi released his first mixtape, Ruby. Its lead single, the first track he wrote entirely in the English language, reached number one on iTunes charts in at least 18 different regions, including Chile, Mexico, Indonesia, and the Philippines.

Discography

Singles

Production discography
All song credits are adapted from the KOMCA database.

Awards and nominations

Notes

References

External links 

Living people
1996 births
South Korean composers
South Korean male idols
Japanese-language singers of South Korea
English-language singers from South Korea
21st-century South Korean male singers
Musicians from Busan
Pledis Entertainment artists
Hybe Corporation artists
Hanlim Multi Art School alumni
Hanyang University alumni